Benjamin Joseph Williams (born 31 March 1999) is a Welsh professional footballer who plays for Cheltenham Town, as a defender.

Club career
Originating from Preston, Williams had spells with Blackburn Rovers and Morecambe before joining Barnsley in June 2017, following a successful trial period. On 4 September 2018, he made his first-team debut during their EFL Trophy victory over Oldham Athletic, featuring for the entire 90 minutes in the 2–1 win. 

Williams made his first league appearance for Barnsley against Peterborough United on 6 October.

On 5 January 2022, Williams joined Cheltenham Town for an undisclosed fee.

Career statistics

Honours
Barnsley
EFL League One runner-up: 2018–19

External links

References

1999 births
Living people
Welsh footballers
Wales youth international footballers
Association football defenders
Blackburn Rovers F.C. players
Morecambe F.C. players
Barnsley F.C. players
Cheltenham Town F.C. players
English Football League players
Footballers from Preston, Lancashire